The Ninetology U9X1 (i9480) is a high-end smartphone developed by Malaysian-based smartphone manufacturer Ninetology. The phone has quad-core MediaTek 1.2 GHz processor, and a RAM of 1 GB, with an internal memory of 16 GB which can be extended to another 32 GB by use of microSD cards. The device also supports dual-sim, internet connectivity through 2G and 3G, apart from Wi-Fi. Navigation systems including A-GPS and GLONASS with Google Maps. It runs on the Android Jelly Bean 4.2 OS. The X1 is one of the three Ninetology U9 series models that was released in July 2013 and this phone is only available to Malaysia and Indonesia. The phone uses a 2200 mAh Li-Ion battery that is capable of lasting up to 8 hours.

Features
4.8″ Super AMOLED Plus HD display; 1280 x 720 px 
Dual SIM
1.2 GHz quad core MediaTek processor
1 GB RAM
16 GB internal memory 
16-megapixels primary camera, 2-megapixels secondary camera
720p @ 30fps full HD recording  with video effect, Aperture, 2nd Generation BSI, HDR, Zero Shutter Delay, Panorama shooting, Face Detection, Fast Burst Shot
Android 4.2.2 (Jelly Bean)
Bluetooth, Wi-Fi, 3G
Stock theme, Play Store
Accelerometer, gyro, proximity, compass, GPS and GLONASS support
Messaging: SMS (threaded view), MMS, Email
Stereo FM radio with RDS
Google Play, Google Search, Maps, Gmail, YouTube, Calendar, Google Talk, Picasa
Voice Memo/Dial/Commands

Release
On July 30, 2013, Ninetology Malaysia announced the launch of the X1 smartphone and released in August. In October 2013, the smartphone became available in Indonesia.

References

External links
 Ninetology U9 - X1

Smartphones
Mobile phones introduced in 2013
Android (operating system) devices